Voznesenka is a rural locality (a selo) in Losevskoye Rural Settlement, Semiluksky District, Voronezh Oblast, Russia. The population was 261 as of 2010. There are 8 streets.

Geography 
Voznesenka is located on the right bank of the Veduga River, 19 km northwest of Semiluki (the district's administrative centre) by road. Losevo is the nearest rural locality.

References 

Rural localities in Semiluksky District